Shakespeare Hall (also known as Ballou, Johnson & Nichols; Sprague—Knight Building) is an historic commercial building at 128 Dorrance Street  in downtown Providence, Rhode Island.  It is a six-story masonry structure, originally built as a three-story Greek Revival structure in 1838 to a design by Tallman & Bucklin.  Its main facade has retained the massive granite pilasters and five-bay configuration from this period.  Originally built to house a theater, the building suffered a massive fire in 1844, leaving only its exterior shell standing.  It was afterward rebuilt to its present height, and a separate brick building at its rear was incorporated into its structure in the late 19th century.  It was used as a warehouse in the 1860s, and has also housed light industrial operations.  Today, the building is used largely for law office space.

The hall was listed on the National Register of Historic Places in 1979.

See also
National Register of Historic Places listings in Providence, Rhode Island

References

Commercial buildings completed in 1838
Commercial buildings on the National Register of Historic Places in Rhode Island
Buildings and structures in Providence, Rhode Island
National Register of Historic Places in Providence, Rhode Island
Historic district contributing properties in Rhode Island